This is a list of thriller films released in the 2020s.

2020

2021

2022

2023

2024

2025

Forthcoming

References

2020s thriller films
Lists of thriller films by decade
Thriller